The Institute for Justice (IJ) is a libertarian non-profit public interest law firm in the United States. It has litigated ten cases before the United States Supreme Court dealing with eminent domain, interstate commerce, public financing for elections, school vouchers, tax credits for private school tuition, civil asset forfeiture, and residency requirements for liquor license. The organization was founded in 1990. As of June 2016, it employed a staff of 95 (including 39 attorneys) in Arlington, Virginia and seven offices across the United States. Its 2016 budget was $20 million.

History 
William H. "Chip" Mellor and Clint Bolick co-founded the organization in 1990 with seed money from conservative libertarian philanthropist Charles Koch. Mellor was the organization's President & General Counsel through 2015. Bolick was the Vice President and Director of Litigation from 1990 until he left the organization in 2004. In March 2015, the organization announced that Mellor will become the chairman of its board of directors in January 2016. Senior Attorney Scott Bullock replaced Mellor as President.

The organization's methods were modeled in part on work Bolick had done as the director of the Landmark Center for Civil Rights in Washington, D.C. For example, in the late 1980s Bolick represented Washington shoeshine stand owner Ego Brown in his attempt to overturn a Jim Crow-era law against bootblack stands on public streets. The law was designed to restrict economic opportunities for African-Americans, but was still being enforced 85 years after its passage. Bolick sued the District of Columbia on Brown's behalf, and the law was overturned in 1989. In 1991, Bolick joined former Department of Energy Deputy General Counsel Chip Mellor to found the Institute for Justice. Mellor had served as president of the Pacific Research Institute for Public Policy, a think tank in San Francisco. According to the Institute for Justice, books commissioned and published by the Pacific Research Institute "formed the Institute for Justice's long-term, strategic litigation blueprint".

Supreme Court cases 

The organization has litigated ten cases that reached the Supreme Court.
 Zelman v. Simmons-Harris, : The court ruled in favor of a Cleveland, Ohio school voucher program, allowing the use of public money to pay tuition at private and parochial schools.
 Swedenburg v. Kelly, : The court struck down laws in New York and Michigan that made it illegal for consumers to buy wine directly from out-of-state wineries. The institute represented small vintners in Virginia and California. (This case was consolidated with Granholm v. Heald prior to consideration by the Supreme Court.)
 Kelo v. City of New London, : The court ruled that the state of Connecticut could use eminent domain to take property from the plaintiffs (a group of homeowners) and transfer it to a private business. The institute represented the home owners.
 Garriott v. Winn, : The court upheld an Arizona program that gave tax credits for private school tuition. This case was consolidated with Arizona Christian School Tuition Organization v. Winn prior to consideration by the Supreme Court.
 Arizona Free Enterprise Club's Freedom Club PAC v. Bennett, : The court struck down part of a public campaign financing law in Arizona that provided additional public funding to candidates based on the amount of spending by their opponents. The institute represented several challengers to the law. This case was consolidated with McComish v. Bennett prior to consideration by the Supreme Court.
 Timbs v. Indiana, : The court ruled that the Eighth Amendment's Excessive Fines Clause is an incorporated protection applicable to the States under the Fourteenth Amendment's Due Process Clause, thus grossly disproportionate asset forfeiture is unconstitutional.
 Tennessee Wine and Spirits Retailers Assn. v. Thomas, : The court ruled the residency requirement for retail liquor licenses violates the Commerce Clause and the 21st Amendment does not save it.
 Espinoza v. Montana Department of Revenue, : The court ruled that excluding religious schools from a tax-funded scholarship program available to non-religious private schools violates the Free Exercise Clause under a strict scrutiny analysis.
 Brownback v. King, : The court ruled that a failure to state a claim ruling in a district court is a judgement on merits and thus triggers the Federal Tort Claims Act's judgement bar, precluding additional claims to be brought under Bivens.
 Carson v. Makin, : A case in which the petitioners argue that Maine's requirement that schools be "non-sectarian" to receive tuition assistance violates the first amendment and fourteenth amendment. The Supreme Court heard oral arguments in the case on December 8, 2021. The Court decided the case in favor of the plaintiffs on June 21, 2022.

Activities

Litigation 
The organization provides pro bono legal advice and representation to clients. According to the organization, it selects cases based on the client's ability to pay (giving preference to clients who do not have the means to obtain other representation), and on the case's potential to publicize and educate the public on the issues involved.

Commercial regulation 
IJ opposes many kinds of business licensing. The organization's first case began in 1991, defending Taalib-Din Uqdah, a Washington, DC businessman who owned a salon to braid hair. Local authorities informed Taalib-Din that he would need a cosmetology license in order to continue operating his business. The institute contended that the licensing requirements did not apply to Taalib-Din's business. Further, the organization claimed that the licensing rules in this case were designed to protect existing businesses from competition, with the effect of reducing choice and raising prices for consumers. The case was dismissed in 1992, but later in that year the city council repealed the cosmetology regulations that prevented Taalib-Din from opening his business. While institute co-founders Clint Bolick and Chip Mellor have acknowledged the need for health, safety, and consumer protection regulations, the organization continues to litigate against what it sees as abuse. It has defended a variety of small business owners across the United States in similar cases involving food cart and street vendors, vendors and makers of caskets, florists, interior designers, and independent taxi drivers. In defending tour guide operators in Philadelphia and Washington D.C., the Institute for Justice argued that restrictions on these businesses abridged First Amendment rights.

In 2005, the organization litigated on behalf of small wineries in California and Virginia. The institute's case, Swedenburg v. Kelly, was consolidated with Granholm v. Heald and considered by the Supreme Court. The court ruled that laws in Michigan and New York that prohibited consumers from buying wine directly from out-of-state wineries were unconstitutional.

In 2009, the organization sued to allow donors to be compensated for giving bone marrow. The National Organ Transplant Act of 1984 (NOTA) made it illegal to compensate organ donors, but did not prevent payment for other forms of donations (such as human plasma, sperm, and egg cells). Although bone marrow is not an organ or a component of an organ, the act made paying bone marrow donors punishable by up to 5 years in prison. At the time the act was passed, donating bone marrow involved a painful and risky medical procedure. In the years after the act was passed, a new procedure (apheresis) made it possible to harvest bone marrow cells through a non-surgical procedure similar to the donation of blood components such as platelets or plasma. The Institute for Justice lawsuit argued that the development of apheresis meant that donors who gave bone marrow through blood donation should be allowed to receive compensation. The organization predicted that allowing compensation would increase the pool of available donors, and claimed that 3,000 Americans die each year while waiting for compatible marrow donors. Critics argued that allowing compensation could reduce donation, increase the risk of disease, and lead to exploitation of the poor. In December 2011, the Ninth Circuit Court of Appeals ruled unanimously that donors giving bone marrow via apheresis were eligible for compensation. In November 2013, the federal government proposed a regulation that would change legal definitions to cover bone marrow regardless of how it is obtained. This would have the effect of keeping the ban on compensating donors in place. However, HHS withdrew the proposed rule in 2017, clearing the way for compensating those who donate via apheresis.

Eminent domain and civil forfeiture 

Eminent domain cases pursued by the organization involve instances where a government seeks to condemn a property and transfer it from one private owner to another (as opposed to using it for a road, building, park, or other publicly owned property). The organization gained national attention in 1996, defending a small business owner in a case involving Trump Casino (Casino Reinvestment Development Authority v. Coking), and again in 2005, arguing Kelo v. City of New London before the Supreme Court. In the casino case, a New Jersey state agency (the Casino Reinvestment Development Authority) was attempting to condemn Vera Coking's boarding house, along with two other businesses in Atlantic City, in order to transfer the properties to a business owned by Donald Trump. In 1998, a New Jersey Superior Court judge ruled that the state was not allowed to seize the properties. However, the ruling did not contest the state's right to take property from one private owner for the purpose of giving it to another. The judge based the ruling on the fact that the state did not get a guarantee that the Trump organization would use the property for a new parking area (as promised), instead of using the property for other purposes such as expanding Trump's casino.
According to the Institute for Justice, the organization received a "deluge" of requests to participate in other cases of eminent domain abuse after its win in the Coking case. In 2008, organization president Chip Mellor stated:

Frankly, we had not realized just how widespread this phenomenon was until [the Coking case] ... Once we became aware of it, though, we formed a strategic plan to escalate it to national attention and ultimately to the Supreme Court, which we did in the course of the next seven years. 

In 2005, the organization represented the plaintiffs in the Supreme Court case Kelo v. City of New London. In this case, the state of Connecticut was attempting to take properties owned by state residents and give them to a private company for use in a development. In a 5-to-4 decision the Supreme Court ruled in favor of the state, affirming the right of states to transfer properties from one private owner to another in this way. The ruling prompted what was widely called a "backlash" against this kind of eminent domain activity. In 2006 (on the first anniversary of the Kelo ruling), President George W. Bush issued an executive order limiting how federal agencies could use eminent domain. Between the Kelo ruling and June 2008, 37 states passed laws to increase restrictions on the use of eminent domain. In 2006, the organization won an eminent domain case in the Ohio Supreme Court, the first eminent domain decision by a state supreme court after Kelo. In the years since, the institute has continued its efforts to reform eminent domain laws.

The organization also works to publicize what it sees as abuse of civil forfeiture laws. Civil forfeiture is the process by which law enforcement agencies in the United States can take property from citizens, based on the suspicion that the property was used in a crime of some kind, without a criminal charge or conviction. Depending on the state law, law enforcement agencies can keep some or all of the confiscated money and property, and apply it to their budgets. State agencies can also confiscate property under federal statutes, and through a program called "equitable sharing" keep up to 80% of the property. The Institute for Justice and other critics argue that this direct financial reward gives law enforcement agencies a strong incentive to abuse civil asset forfeiture. In these cases, the organization occasionally works with other advocacy groups such as the American Civil Liberties Union (ACLU), The Heritage Foundation, and the American Bankers Association.

Campaign finance 

In 2011, the organization challenged an Arizona law in the United States Supreme Court (Arizona Free Enterprise Club's Freedom Club PAC v. Bennett). The law provided increased public campaign funding based on the amount spent by a candidate's opponent. The institute argued that the law violated the First Amendment rights of independent groups and candidates who do not accept public financing. In a 5–4 ruling, the court struck down the part of the law that provided escalating matching funds. Writing for the majority, Chief Justice John Roberts wrote that the law forced independent groups to face a choice: "trigger matching funds, change your message, or do not speak." Other Institute for Justice cases involve regulations on political activity related to elections.

Education 

The organization has litigated several cases related to education reform and school vouchers, including three successful cases that went to the Supreme Court: Zelman v. Simmons-Harris (2002), Garriott v. Winn (2010), and Espinoza v. Montana Department of Revenue (2020). In the Zelman case, the Supreme Court ruled that parents can use public money (in the form of school vouchers) to pay tuition at private schools, including parochial schools. The institute represented parents in that case. In the Garriott case, the court dismissed a challenge to a program in Arizona that gave state tax credits for payment of private school tuition. The institute argued in favor of dismissal. In the Espinoza case, the court ruled that Montana could not exclude religious schools from state scholarship program funded by tax credits available to non-religious private schools.

Activism and coalitions 
The institute maintains training programs, activism networks, and partnerships with other organizations.

The IJ Clinic on Entrepreneurship is a joint project of the Institute for Justice and The University of Chicago Law School. The clinic provides free legal services for startups and other entrepreneurs in economically disadvantaged communities in the Chicago area.

The organization provides educational opportunities for law students, such as a yearly conference for law students at George Washington University. According to the Institute for Justice, participants in the conference, along with the organization's former law clerks and interns, can join the institute's "Human Action Network". The institute offers to match network members with volunteer and pro-bono opportunities in their local communities. The organization also recruits volunteers for its "Liberty in Action" project, for support activism by non-lawyers. The institute founded the Castle Coalition in 2002 to provide more specific tools for activists in the area of eminent domain abuse.

Finances 
IJ operates as a 501(c)(3) tax-exempt nonprofit. Charity Navigator has given the institute a four-star rating (out of four) for financial transparency and efficiency in each year since it began evaluating charities in 2001.

According to the institute, 85 percent of contributions in 2012 came from individuals, with 14 percent coming from foundations and 1 percent coming from businesses.
As of 2005, IJ did not actively solicit corporate donations. According to information provided to the Internal Revenue Service, the organization spent about $12.8 million in the fiscal year ending June 2013. In that year, 83.2% of money spent went to the programs and services the institute delivers, with the rest going to administrative expenses (9.4%) and fund raising expenses (7.2%).

See also 
 Dana Berliner, Litigation Director at the Institute for Justice
 Libertarian theories of law

References

External links 
 
 Institute for Justice Profile at Charity Navigator

Civil liberties advocacy groups in the United States
Organizations established in 1990
Libertarian organizations based in the United States
501(c)(3) organizations
Legal advocacy organizations in the United States
Non-profit organizations based in Arlington, Virginia
Government watchdog groups in the United States
1990 establishments in Virginia
Law firms based in Virginia